Monuments to Thieves is the second studio album by American crust punk band His Hero Is Gone. It was released on November 18, 1997 through Prank Records. It was recorded by Dan Rathburn at Polymorph in Oakland, California. Featuring the band's typical crust punk sound, the album deals with topics such as institutional racism and oppression.

Critical reception

AllMusic critic Paul Kott described Monuments to Thieves as "a masterpiece: a tight, cohesive, thought provoking call for change from street level" and stated that "the songwriting and confidence displayed on this recording are completely irrefutable." Kott also further wrote that the album "may be more of the same from this amazing band, but it's so much more."

Track listing
 "Like Weeds" — 2:20
 "Monuments to Thieves" — 1:53
 "Paranoia Secured" — 0:20
 "Carry On" — 1:42
 "Automation" — 0:51
 "Cavities" — 1:32
 "Chain of Command" — 3:33
 "Headless/Heartless" — 2:06
 "Hinges" — 1:01
 "Sin & Vice" — 1:31
 "The Mess" — 1:09
 "Disease of Ease" — 1:36
 "Under Watchful Eyes" — 1:27
 "Stacks" — 1:32
 "The Unwanted Child" — 2:42

Personnel
Album personnel as adapted from album liner notes.
His Hero Is Gone
 Todd Burdette — guitar, vocals
 Yannick Lorraine — guitar
 Carl Auge — bass, vocals
 Paul Burdette — drums

Other personnel
 Dan Rathbun — recording engineer, producer
 George Horn — mastering

References

External links
 

1997 albums
His Hero Is Gone albums
Works about racism